Eve White was an English television actress. 
Among other roles, she appeared as Sue Morgan on the soap opera Hollyoaks from 1999 to 2002.

White is now a literary agent in London, UK, having founded Eve White Literary Agency in 2003.

References

External links
Eve White: Literary Agent

Living people
Literary agents
English television actresses
English soap opera actresses
Year of birth missing (living people)
Place of birth missing (living people)